Woodrow Wilson "Foots" Clements (July 30, 1914 – October 3, 2002) was an American businessman who helped to build the soft drink Dr. Pepper into a global brand. He served as the company's chief executive officer (CEO) and chairman of the board from 1974 to 1986.

Biography
Clements was born on July 30, 1914 in Windham Springs, Alabama. He was named after then-President of the United States Woodrow Wilson. He became known as "Foots" in high school because of his unusually shaped toes. In 1935, while attending the University of Alabama, he began working for Dr. Pepper, initially selling their product out of a delivery truck. In 1942, he became a zone sales manager for Dr. Pepper, and he began working at the company's headquarters in Texas in 1944. He was named Dr. Pepper's general sales manager in 1957, executive vice president and director in 1967, president and chief operating officer in 1969, and chairman of the board and CEO in 1974. He continued to chair the board until 1986, and served as a member of the board until 1995. In 1986, he became chairman emeritus, which he described at the time as "a title of honor that still carries certain responsibilities and authority." He continued to serve as a director at Dr. Pepper until 1995. He died on October 3, 2002 at the age of 88, after suffering from dementia.

References

1914 births
2002 deaths
People from Tuscaloosa County, Alabama
University of Alabama alumni
American chief executives of food industry companies
Businesspeople from Alabama
20th-century American businesspeople